Coyote Lake is a 2019 American psychological thriller drama film, directed and written by Sara Seligman. The film is produced by Nikki Stier Justice, Van Johnson, Anne Clements, and Ash Christian under the banner of Cranked Up Films, and Van Johnson Company. The film stars Camila Mendes, Charlie Weber, Adriana Barraza, Neil Sandilands, and Manny Pérez. The film was scheduled to release on 2 August 2019.

The movie revolves around a woman and her daughter. They live in a deserted guest house. Drugging guests and killing them seems to be the order of the day for them. Two drug dealers emerge and change the daughter’s perception about life. The daughter finally gets courage to escape the best way she knows how.

Cast 

 Camila Mendes as Ester
 Charlie Weber as Mario
 Adriana Barraza as Teresa
 Neil Sandilands as Dirk
 Manny Perez as Ignacio

Reception

Critical response 

Steve Davis of The Austin Chronicle wrote, "The exquisitely precise direction by Seligman (making an impressive debut here), the trim editing by Eric F. Martin, the gorgeous nighttime cinematography by Matthias Schubert – all contribute to an eerie otherworldliness in this beautifully executed opening sequence of Coyote Lake". Frank Scheck of The Hollywood Reporter wrote, "The film is carried along by the strength of Mendes' emotionally complex, restrained performance that makes clear that Ester is as much victim as accomplice".

References

External links 

 

2019 films
2010s psychological drama films
2010s serial killer films
2019 independent films
2019 psychological thriller films
2019 thriller drama films
American independent films
American serial killer films
American thriller drama films
2010s American films